Thousand Springs Creek is a stream in the U.S. states of Nevada and Utah. It is a tributary to Grouse Creek.

Thousand Springs Creek was named for the fact it is fed by many springs along its course.

References

Rivers of Box Elder County, Utah
Rivers of Elko County, Nevada
Rivers of Nevada
Rivers of Utah